The Café Stefanie was a coffeehouse in Munich which around the 1900s till the 1920s was the leading artists' meeting place in the city, similar to the Café Größenwahn atmosphere of the Café des Westens in Berlin and the Café Griensteidl in Vienna. 
At the time it was one of the few establishments in Munich which stayed open till 3:00 in the morning.

Regular patrons and visitors included Johannes R. Becher, Hanns Bolz, Hans Carossa, Theodor Däubler, Kurt Eisner, Hanns Heinz Ewers, Leonhard Frank, Otto Gross, Emmy Hennings, Arthur Holitscher, Eduard von Keyserling, Paul Klee, Alfred Kubin, Gustav Landauer, Heinrich Mann, Gustav Meyrink, Erich Mühsam, Erwin Piscator, Lotte Pritzel, Alexander Roda Roda, Ernst Toller, B. Traven and Frank Wedekind.

References

External links 

www.muenchen.de
zeitenblicke 5 (2006), Nr. 2 (PDF-file (German). (25 kB)
Otto Gross an Frieda Weekley

History of Munich
Buildings and structures in Munich
Food and drink companies based in Munich
Coffeehouses and cafés in Germany